The following lists events that happened during 1972 in Australia.

Incumbents

Monarch – Elizabeth II
Governor-General – Sir Paul Hasluck
Prime Minister –  William McMahon (until 5 December), then Gough Whitlam
Deputy Prime Minister – Doug Anthony (until 5 December), then Lance Barnard
Opposition Leader – Gough Whitlam (until 5 December), then Billy Snedden (from 20 December)
Chief Justice – Sir Garfield Barwick

State and territory leaders
Premier of New South Wales – (Sir) Robert Askin
Opposition Leader – Pat Hills
Premier of Queensland – Joh Bjelke-Petersen
Opposition Leader – Jack Houston
Premier of South Australia – Don Dunstan
Opposition Leader – Steele Hall (until 15 March), then Bruce Eastick
Premier of Tasmania – Angus Bethune (until 3 May), then Eric Reece
Opposition Leader – Eric Reece (until 3 May), then Max Bingham
Premier of Victoria – Sir Henry Bolte (until 23 August), then Rupert Hamer
Opposition Leader – Clyde Holding
Premier of Western Australia – John Tonkin
Opposition Leader – Sir David Brand (until 5 June), then Sir Charles Court

Governors and administrators
Governor of New South Wales – Sir Roden Cutler
Governor of Queensland – Sir Alan Mansfield (until 21 March), then Sir Colin Hannah
Governor of South Australia – Sir Mark Oliphant 
Governor of Tasmania – Lieutenant General Sir Edric Bastyan
Governor of Victoria – Major General Sir Rohan Delacombe
Governor of Western Australia – Major General Sir Douglas Kendrew
Administrator of Norfolk Island – Robert Dalkin (until August), then Edward Pickerd
Administrator of the Northern Territory – Sir Frederick Chaney
Administrator of Papua and New Guinea – Les Johnson

Events

26 January – Aboriginal Tent Embassy was constructed in front of Parliament House (now old Parliament House).
10 May – Law professor George Duncan is drowned in the Torrens River, Adelaide. Police establish that his death was a homophobic-related murder. 
3 June – Douglas Nicholls becomes the first Indigenous Australian to be knighted.
29 July – Kerry Anne Wells earned Australia's first Miss Universe crown, in Dorado, Puerto Rico.
30 August - Three people are killed in the 1972 Taroom explosion when a burning truck loaded with ammonium nitrate explodes near Taroom, Queensland.
6 October – Faraday School kidnapping – six pupils and their teacher are kidnapped for $1 million ransom in Victoria.
15 November – First aircraft hijacking in Australia. Ansett Airlines Flight 232 from Adelaide to Alice Springs with 28 passengers and a crew of 4. Followed by gun battle at Alice Springs Airport.
1 December – Belinda Green is crowned Miss World in London, becoming the second Australian winner of this pageant. Australia won the two most important beauty contest in this year.
2 December – 1972 Australian federal election: The Labor Party led by Gough Whitlam defeats the Liberal/Country Coalition Government led by Prime Minister William McMahon. Consequently, Whitlam becomes the first Labor Prime Minister of Australia since the defeat of Ben Chifley in 1949.
 Shane Gould is announced as Australian of the Year
 The health warning, "Smoking is a Health Hazard" becomes compulsory on cigarette packets in Australia.

Arts and literature

 Thea Astley's novel The Acolyte wins the Miles Franklin Award

Film
 The Adventures of Barry McKenzie

Television
13 March – Controversial soap opera Number 96 debuts on Network 0–10.
16 November – The Aunty Jack Show premieres on ABC-TV in Sydney.

Sport
16 September – Bernard Vine wins the men's national marathon title, clocking 2:28:21 in Richmond, Australia.
 Manly-Warringah defeated Eastern Suburbs 19–14 in the 1972 NSWRFL season Grand Final, claiming the first premiership win in the club's history. Parramatta finish in last position, claiming the wooden spoon.
In the Bulimba Cup final Brisbane defeat Toowoomba 55–2 at Lang Park
 Piping Lane wins the Melbourne Cup
  Western Australia wins the Sheffield Shield
 American Eagle takes line and handicap honours in the Sydney to Hobart Yacht Race
 Shane Gould wins 3 gold medals for swimming at the 1972 Summer Olympics in Munich
 Australia draws Ashes Cricket Test Series 2–2 with England

Births
 2 January – Adam Elliot, animator and screenwriter
 7 January – Shane Kelly, cyclist
 16 January 
 Ang Christou, Australian rules footballer
 Greg Page, former member of The Wiggles
 21 January – Brett Mullins, rugby league player
 1 February – Taryn Fiebig, opera and musical theatre soprano (died 2021)
 5 February – Brad Fittler, rugby league footballer and coach
 6 February – Mark Ladbrook, track and field sprinter
 7 March – Simon Pryce, current member of The Wiggles
 9 March – Spencer Howson, radio announcer
 11 March – Adam Bandt, politician
 25 March – Nina Bonner, field hockey goalkeeper
 8 April –  Katrina Powell, field hockey player
 15 April – Glenn Butcher, politician
 26 April - Kerri Nayda, supermum and friend extraordinaire
 16 May – Adam Crouch, politician
 20 May – Michael Diamond, professional target shooter
 30 May - Simon Holmes à Court, entrepreneur and founder of Climate 200
 30 May –  Renita Farrell, field hockey player
 31 May – Sarah Murdoch, model, actress and television presenter
 19 June – Poppy Montgomery, actress
 22 June – Damien Oliver, jockey
 24 June – Robbie McEwen, cyclist
 24 June –  Ian Rutledge, field hockey coach
 30 June –  Stuart Rendell, hammer thrower
 6 July – Daniel Andrews, Premier of Victoria
 14 July  – Deborah Mailman, actress and singer 
 26 July  – Nathan Buckley, Australian rules footballer
 12 August –  Allison Tranquilli, basketball player
 1 September –  Louise Dobson, field hockey player
 19 September
Matt Cockbain, rugby player and coach
Ryan Girdler, rugby league player
 20 September –  Jenn Morris, field hockey player
 11 October –  Claudia Black, actress
 1 November –  Toni Collette, actress
 7 November –  Melissa Bell, actress
 8 November – Kylie Shadbolt, artistic gymnast
 13 November –  Samantha Riley, swimmer
 9 December – Annalise Braakensiek, model, actress, television presenter, businesswoman and activist (died 2019)
 11 December – Del Kathryn Barton, artist
 12 December – Quan Yeomans, musician; lead singer of Regurgitator
 13 December – Chris Grant, Australian rules footballer
 22 December –  Anthony Edwards, rower
 28 December –  Patrick Rafter, tennis player

Deaths
 6 January – Olegas Truchanas (born 1923), conservationist and nature photographer
 22 January – Jack Cummings (born 1901), tennis player
 2 February – Matt Goggin (born 1936), Australian rules footballer (Geelong)
 15 February – Sir Kenneth Street (born 1890), Chief Justice of New South Wales
 29 February – Ernie Barber (born 1895), Australian rules footballer (South Melbourne)
 9 March – Roy Kendall (born 1899), politician and MI6 officer
 19 March – 
 George Bassett (born 1888), politician
 Jack Carington Smith (born 1908), artist
 16 April – Frank O'Connor (born 1894), public servant
 2 May – Arthur Trebilcock (born 1907), Tasmanian cricketer
 7 July – Owen Dixon (born 1886), former Chief Justice of Australia
 21 August – Ernestine Hill (born 1899), author
 23 September – Peter O'Sullivan (born 1932), Australian rules footballer (Essendon, North Melbourne)
 4 November – Harry Rigby (born 1896), World War I flying ace

References

 
Australia
Years of the 20th century in Australia